A liquid hydrogen tank car, also called liquid hydrogen tank wagon or liquid hydrogen tanker wagon is a railroad tank car designed to carry cryogenic liquid hydrogen (LH2).

Design

Classes
Cryogenic liquid tank cars in the USA are classified as follows:
 DOT-113 tank cars (Cryogenic liquid tank cars)
 AAR-204W tank cars (Cryogenic liquid tank cars)
 AAR-204XT (Inside boxcar)

See also

 Association of American Railroads (AAR)
 Compressed hydrogen tube trailer
Hydrogen economy
Hydrogen infrastructure
 Liquid hydrogen tanktainer
 Liquid hydrogen trailer
 United States Department of Transportation (DOT)
Vacuum flask
Vapor-cooled neck
Vapor-cooled radiation shield

References

External links
Liquid Hydrogen Transport by Rail

Freight rolling stock
Hydrogen infrastructure
Industrial gases